This is a list of American football players who have played for the Buffalo Bills of the American Football League (AFL) and the National Football League (NFL).  It includes players that have played at least one official game in an AFL or NFL regular season.  The Buffalo Bills franchise was founded in the AFL in the 1960 and joined the NFL in 1970.  The Bills played for three AFL Championships and won two.  They have also had four Super Bowl appearances, but have yet to win one. This list is very incomplete.



A
Ray Abruzzese,
Bill Acker,
Bill Adams,
Sam Adams,
Chidi Ahanotu,
Sam Aiken,
Ethan Albright,
Ira Albright,
Glenn Alexander,
Mike Alexander,
Bruce Alford,
Doug Allen,
Josh Allen,
Jackie Allen,
Steve Alvers,
Bennie Anderson,
Max Anderson,
Tim Anderson,
Al Andrews,
Jake Arians,
Justin Armour,
John Armstrong,
Bill Atkins,
Joe Auer,
Rob Awalt,
Joe Azelby

B
Bill "Teddy" Bailey,
Carlton Bailey,
Art Baker,
Mel Baker,
Rashad Baker,
Gary Baldinger,
Howard Ballard,
Justin Bannan,
Bradford Banta,
Stew Barber,
Buster Barnett,
Oliver Barnett,
Bob Barrett,
Glenn Bass,
Marv Bateman,
David Bavaro,
Martin Bayless,
Tim Beamer,
Tom Beard,
Doug Becker,
Don Beebe,
Dave Behrman,
Veno Belk,
Greg Bell,
Rodney Bellinger,
Al Bemiller,
Carey Bender,
Cornelius Bennett,
Ray Bentley,
Fred Besana,
Gerald Bess,
Rufus Bess,
Charlie Bivins,
Avion Black,
Phil Blazer,
Drew Bledsoe,
Joe Bock,
Dewey Bohling,
Jon Borchardt,
Nate Borden,
Jason Bostic,
Matt Bowen,
Jerry Boyarsky,
Kerry Brady,
Mark Brammer,
Dan Brandenburg,
Chris Brantley,
Jason Bratton,
Jack Bravyak,
Hezekiah Braxton,
Jim Braxton,
Marlin Briscoe,
Mitchell Brookins,
Billy Brooks,
Bucky Brooks,
Clifford Brooks,
Walter Broughton,
Antonio Brown,
Charlie Brown,
Curtis Brown,
Fred Brown,
Lance Brown,
Marc Brown,
Monty Brown,
Ruben Brown,
Tony Brown,
Travis Brown,
Dick Brubaker,
Copeland Bryan,
Shawn Bryson,
Gary Bugenhagen,
Chris Burkett,
Bobby Burnett,
Joe Burns,
Jeff Burris,
Derrick Burroughs,
Leonard Burton,
Brad Butler,
Jerametrius Butler,
Jerry Butler,
Reggie Bynum,
Butch Byrd,
Jairus Byrd,
Carl Byrum

C
Bill Cahill,
Darryl Caldwell,
Don Calhoun,
Bill Callahan,
Arnold Campbell,
Mark Campbell,
Joe Cannavino,
Bob Cappadona,
Richard Carey,
Wray Carlton,
Jon Carman,
Brian Carpenter,
Keion Carpenter,
Levert Carr,
Mark Catano,
Greg Cater,
Kwame Cavil,
Mario Celotto,
Larry Centers,
Dan Chamberlain,
Kirk Chambers,
Bob Chandler,
Edgar Chandler,
Dave Chapple,
Carl Charon,
Richard Cheek,
Don Chelf,
Joe Chetti,
Jim Cheyunski,
Bob Christiansen,
Steve Christie,
Greg Christy,
Brad Cieslak,
Allan Clark,
Mario Clark,
Steve Clark,
Hagood Clarke,
Nate Clements,
Tony Cline,
Sherman Cocroft,
Tim Cofield,
Will Cokeley,
Linzy Cole,
Clarence Coleman,
Fred Coleman,
Mike Collier,
Bobby Collins,
Greg Collins,
Jerald Collins,
Todd Collins,
Billy Conaty,
Shane Conlan,
Robert Coons,
Russell Copeland,
Robert "Bo" Cornell,
Frank Cornish Jr.,
Dave Costa,
Paul Costa,
Damien Covington,
Sam Cowart,
Al Cowlings,
Jerry Crafts,
Neal Craig,
Hilton Crawford,
Joe Cribbs,
Bobby Crockett,
Monte Crockett,
Don Croft,
Phil Crosby,
Justin Cross,
Jim Crotty,
Wayne Crow,
Angelo Crowell,
Phil Croyle,
Walt Cudzik,
George Cumby,
Joe Cummings,
Dick Cunningham,
Jeff Curchin

D
Brad Daluiso,
Joe Danelo,
Matt Darby,
Dan Darragh,
Stan David,
André Davis,
John Davis,
Kenneth Davis,
Wayne Davis,
Julius Dawkins,
Tom Day,
Joe DeLamielleure,
Jerry DeLucca,
Tom Dempsey,
Anthony Denman,
Preston Dennard,
Austin Denney,
Ryan Denney,
Wayne DeSutter,
Chuck Devliegher,
Joe Devlin,
Mike Devlin,
Anthony Dickerson,
John DiGiorgio,
Tony Discenzo,
John Dittrich,
Conrad Dobler,
Derrick Dockery,
Phil Dokes,
Gene Donaldson,
Jon Dorenbos,
Al Dorow,
Sean Dowling,
Tommy Doyle,
Dwight Drane,
Tony Driver,
Elbert Drungo,
Elbert Dubenion,
Joe Dufek,
Mike Dumas,
Jim Dunaway,
Bill Dunstan

E
Michael Early,
Quinn Early,
Booker Edgerson,
Al Edwards,
Dwan Edwards,
Earl Edwards,
Emmett Edwards,
Larry Edwards,
Ron Edwards,
Trent Edwards,
Tom Ehlers,
Keith Ellison,
Bill Enyart,
Tom Erlandson,
Mike Estep,
Tim Euhus,
Greg Evans,
Lee Evans,
Kevin Everett,
Liam Ezekiel

F
Dale Farley,
Marcus Farley,
Kris Farris,
Randy Fasani,
Greg Favors,
Ralph Felton,
Duke Fergerson,
Charley Ferguson,
Joe Ferguson,
Vince Ferragamo,
Sonny Fexico,
John Fina,
Bryce Fisher,
Ryan Fitzpatrick,
London Fletcher,
George Flint,
Judson Flint,
Tom Flores,
Erik Flowers,
Marcus Floyd,
Doug Flutie,
Dave Foley,
Charlie Ford,
Cole Ford,
Fred Ford,
Jay Foreman,
Fred Forsberg,
Melvin Fowler,
Wayne Fowler,
Wilmer Fowler,
Wallace Francis,
Mike Franckowiak,
Byron Franklin,
Jack Frantz,
Guy Frazier,
Wayne Frazier,
Steve Freeman,
Mitch Frerotte,
Larry Friday,
Eddie Fuller,
Dan Fulton,
Ed Fulton,
Tony Furjanic

G
Bob Gaddis,
Michael Gaines,
Sheldon Gaines,
Mitchell Galloway,
Mike Gandy,
Reuben Gant,
Jerome Gantt,
Carwell Gardner,
Hal Garner,
Scott Garnett,
Leon Garror,
Sam Gash,
Lionel Gates,
Cory Geason,
Stan Gelbaugh,
Reggie Germany,
Reuben Gibson,
Gale Gilbert,
Cookie Gilchrist,
Bob Gladieux,
Clyde Glosson,
Keith Goganious,
Pete Gogolak,
Doug Goodwin,
Lennox Gordon,
Gene Grabosky,
Don Graham,
Shayne Graham,
Tom Graham,
Wes Grant,
Will Grant,
Willie Grate,
Chris Green,
Donnie Green,
Johnny Green,
Van Green,
Doug Greene,
Tony Greene,
Donovan Greer,
Jabari Greer,
Ben Gregory,
Brent Griffith,
Bill Groman,
Paul Guidry,
Grant Guthrie

H
Drew Haddad,
Halvor Hagen,
Mario Haggan,
Odell Haggins,
John Hagy,
Kris Haines,
Chris Hale,
Mike Hamby,
Randy Hand,
Phil Hansen,
Dee Hardison,
Anthony Hargrove,
Ronnie Harmon,
Darrell Harper,
James Harris,
Dwight Harrison,
Kevin Harrison,
Dick Hart,
Leo Hart,
Richard Harvey,
Waddy Harvey,
Clint Haslerig,
Jim Haslett,
Gary Hayman,
Don Healy,
Clayton Heath,
Craig Heimburger,
Dale Hellestrae,
Jerome Henderson,
Carey Henley,
Travis Henry,
Joe Hergert,
Scott Hernandez,
Efren Herrera,
Craig Hertwig,
Bob Hews,
Cliff Hicks,
Robert Hicks,
Tom Higgins,
Ike Hill,
J. D. Hill,
Raion Hill,
Ray Hill,
Rod Hill,
Billy Joe Hobert,
Al Hoisington,
Kelly Holcomb,
John Holecek,
Mike Hollis,
Darick Holmes,
Mike Holmes,
Robert Holt,
Roland Hooks,
Mike Houghton,
Ron Howard,
Steve Hoyem,
Floyd Hudlow,
Dick Hudson,
Kent Hull,
Corey Hulsey,
Mike Humiston,
David Humm,
Jeff Hunter,
Scott Hunter,
Tony Hunter,
Bill Hurley,
Chuck Hurston,
Scott Hutchinson,
Anthony Hutchison
Chris Hogan

I
Mekeli Ieremia,
Grant Irons,
Darrell Irvin,
Ken Irvin

J
Fred Jackson,
Kirby Jackson,
Randy Jackson,
Ray Jackson,
Rusty Jackson,
Sheldon Jackson,
Frank Jackunas,
Harry Jacobs,
George Jakowenko,
Robert James,
Tom Janik,
Bruce Jarvis,
Ray Jarvis,
Jim Jeffcoat,
Jason Jefferson,
Billy Jenkins,
Ed Jenkins,
Jonas Jennings,
Greg Jerman,
Ron Jessie,
Gene Jeter,
Dan Jilek,
Billy Joe,
Leon Joe,
Charles Johnson,
Dennis Johnson (DT),
Dennis Johnson (FB),
Filmel Johnson,
Flip Johnson,
Jack Johnson,
Jim Johnson,
Ken Johnson (DE),
Ken Johnson (QB),
Lawrence Johnson,
Lonnie Johnson,
Mark Johnson,
Rob Johnson,
Trumaine Johnson,
Doug Jones,
Ed Jones,
Fred Jones,
Greg Jones,
Henry Jones,
Ken Jones,
Mike Jones,
Spike Jones,
Steve Jones,
Willie Jones,
Zay Jones,
Yonel Jourdain,
Trey Junkin

K
Mike Kadish,
John Kaiser,
Bob Kalsu,
Bob Kampa,
Chris Keating,
Tom Keating,
Ernie Kellerman,
Jim Kelly,
Chris Kelsay,
Mark Kelso,
Jack Kemp,
Mike Kennedy,
Don Kern,
Rex Kern,
Marlon Kerner,
John Kidd,
Dave Kilson,
John Kimbrough,
Bill Kinard,
Howard Kindig,
Bruce King,
Charley King,
Eric King,
Tony King,
Rick Kingrea,
Kliff Kingsbury,
Larry Kinnebrew,
Jeff Kinney,
Roger Kochman,
Matt Kofler,
Ted Koy,
Merv Krakau,
Bob Kruse,
Larry Kubin,
Joe Kulbacki,
Rod Kush

L
Corbin Lacina,
Kevin Lamar,
Brad Lamb,
Daryle Lamonica,
Jack Laraway,
Leif Larsen,
Bill Laskey,
Art Laster,
Jerome Lawson,
Roosevelt Leaks,
Bob LeBlanc,
Monte Ledbetter,
Ken Lee,
Matt Leinart,
Jim LeMoine,
Chuck Leo,
Jim Leonhard,
Cotton Letner,
Mike Levenseller,
Frank Lewis,
Harold Lewis,
John Lewis,
Reggie Lewis,
Rich Lewis,
John Leypoldt,
Keith Lincoln,
Rian Lindell,
Adam Lingner,
Jonathan Linton,
John Little,
Jeff Lloyd,
Mike Lodish,
James Lofton,
Carson Long,
J. P. Losman,
Corey Louchiey,
Kamil Loud,
Tom Louderback,
Angelo Loukas,
Warren Loving,
Richie Lucas,
Joey Lumpkin,
Booth Lusteg,
Jeff Lyman,
Marshawn Lynch,
Tom Lynch

M
Mark Maddox,
Paul Maguire,
Steve Maidlow,
Bill Majors,
Roy Manning,
Dan Manucci, 
EJ Manuel, 
Gary Marangi,
Frank Marchlewski,
Vince Marrow,
David Martin,
Manny Martin,
Eugene Marve,
Billy Masters,
Bruce Mathison,
John Matlock,
Archie Matsos,
Shane Matthews,
Marv Matuszak,
David Mays,
Mike McBath,
Richie McCabe,
Mike McCaffrey,
John McCargo,
Randy McClanahan,
Brian McClure,
Brian McConnell,
John McCrumbly,
Lawrence McCutcheon,
Jeremy McDaniel,
Gary McDermott,
Ron McDole,
Don McDonald,
Brady McDonnell,
Thad McFadden,
Dylan McFarland,
Jim McFarland,
Willis McGahee,
Terrence McGee,
Joe McGrail,
Dan McGrew,
Keith McKeller,
Keith McKenzie,
Reggie McKenzie,
Bill McKinley,
Royce McKinney,
Ted McKnight,
Eddie McMillan,
Chuck McMurtry,
Sean McNanie,
Dave Means,
Mike Mercer,
Dudley Meredith,
Mark Merrill,
Aaron Merz,
Bruce Mesner,
Pete Metzelaars,
Ed Meyer,
Nick Mike-Mayer,
Bill Miller,
Mark Miller,
Terry Miller,
Lawyer Milloy,
Pete Mills,
Tom Minter,
John Mistler,
Charley Mitchell,
Roland Mitchell,
Chris Mohr,
Matt Monger,
Mike Montler,
Keith Moody,
Booker Moore,
Corey Moore,
Dave Moore,
Leroy Moore,
Ricky Moore,
Brian Moorman,
Sean Moran,
Sammy Morris,
Greg Morton,
Haven Moses,
Mike Mosley,
Wayne Mosley, 
Roland Moss,
Eric Moulds,
Ed Muelhaupt,
Jamie Mueller,
Bill Munson,
Jesse Murdock,
Matt Murphy,
Tom Myslinski

N
Jamie Nails,
Craig Nall,
Speedy Neal,
Ryan Neill,
Bob Nelson,
Chuck Nelson,
Shane Nelson,
Shawn Nelson, 
Ryan Neufeld,
Keith Newman,
John Nies,
Nick Nighswander,
Jeff Nixon,
Ulysses Norris,
Gabe Northern,
Scott Norwood,
Julian Nunamaker,
Chip Nuzzo

O
Tommy O'Connell,
Nate Odomes,
Joe O'Donnell,
Neil O'Donoghue,
Kendrick Office,
Dave Ogas,
Steve Okoniewski,
Chris Oldham,
Dan O'Leary,
Frank Oliver,
Harold Olson,
Jerry Ostroski,
Artie Owens,
Terrell Owens
Ed Oliver

P
Dick Palmer,
Sam Palumbo,
Mike Panepinto,
Joe Panos,
Ervin Parker,
Glenn Parker,
Kerry Parker,
Willie Parker,
John Parrella,
Lemar Parrish,
Roscoe Parrish,
Rick Partridge,
Lloyd Pate,
Herb Paterra,
Wayne Patrick,
Bob Patton,
James Patton,
Jerry Patton,
Marvcus Patton,
Walt Patulski,
Bryce Paup,
Bob Penchion,
Terrance Pennington,
Marlo Perry,
Jim Perryman,
Jason Peters,
Bob Petrich,
Tommy Pharr,
Ed Philion,
Kim Phillips,
Lou Piccone,
Mark Pike,
John Pitts,
Ron Pitts,
Kurt Ploeger,
Bobby Ply,
DaShon Polk,
David Pool,
Daryl Porter,
Kerry Porter,
Ricky Porter,
Jeff Posey,
Paul Posluszny,
Steve Potter,
Art Powell,
Darnell Powell,
Steve Powell,
Dean Prater,
Duke Preston,
Marcus Price,
Peerless Price,
Shawn Price,
Terry Price,
Pierson Prioleau,
Remi Prudhomme,
Mike Pruitt,
Mike Pucillo

Q

R
Warren Rabb,
Scott Radecic,
Eason Ramson,
Al Randolph,
Ahmad Rashad,
Eddie Ray,
Andre Reed,
Josh Reed,
Izell Reese,
Jerry Reese,
Roy Reeves,
Frank Reich,
Andy Reid,
Jim Reilly,
Dennis Remmert,
Mack Reynolds,
Benny Ricardo,
Ken Rice,
Perry Richards,
Eric Richardson,
Pete Richardson,
Mike Richey,
Robb Riddick,
Elston Ridgle,
Preston Ridlehuber,
Jay Riemersma,
Ray Rissmiller,
Jim Ritcher,
Constantin Ritzmann,
Hank Rivera,
Irvin "Bo" Roberson,
Bernard Robertson,
Isiah Robertson,
Tyrone Robertson,
Eddie Robinson,
Matt Robinson,
Charlie Rogers,
Reggie Rogers,
Sam Rogers,
Butch Rolle,
Charles Romes,
Mark Roopenian,
Durwood Roquemore,
Hatch Rosdahl,
Erik Rosenmeier,
Louis Ross,
Willie Ross,
Robert Royal,
Benny Russell,
Charles Rutkowski,
Ed Rutkowski,
Tom Ruud,
Tom Rychlec

S
Tom Saidock,
George Saimes,
Lucius Sanford,
Lauvale Sape,
John Saunders,
Joe Schaffer,
Todd Schlopy,
Bob Schmidt,
Henry Schmidt,
Steve Schnarr,
Mike Schneck,
Aaron Schobel,
Marty Schottenheimer,
Rick Schulte,
Kurt Schulz,
Josh Scobey,
Bryan Scott,
John Scott,
Leon Seals,
Bob Sedlock,
Andy Selfridge,
Tom Sestak,
Paul Seymour,
Billy Shaw,
Bobby Shaw,
Dennis Shaw,
Daimon Shelton,
Johnny Shepherd,
Tom Sherman,
Joe Shipp,
Bill Shockley,
Mark Shupe,
Dainon Sidney,
Joe Silipo,
Wayne Simmons,
Ken Simonton,
Bill Simpson,
Ko Simpson,
O. J. Simpson,
John Skorupan,
Eric Smedley,
Fred Smerlas,
Allen Smith,
Antowain Smith,
Bobby Smith,
Bruce Smith,
Carl Smith,
Don Smith (DL),
Don Smith (RB),
Jonathan Smith,
Lawrence Smith,
Lee Smith,
Leonard Smith,
Lucious Smith,
Marty Smith,
Thomas Smith,
Tody Smith,
Cal Snowden,
Ben Sobieski,
Roland Solomon,
Don Sommer,
Jim Sorey,
Chris Spielman,
Jack Spikes,
Takeo Spikes,
Brandon Spoon,
Marcus Spriggs,
Josh Stamer,
Joe Staysniak,
Anthony Steels,
Fred Steinfort,
Kay Stephenson,
Matt Stevens,
Dominique Stevenson,
Art Still,
Walter Stith,
Donnie Stone,
Ken Stone,
Mike Stratton,
Rick Strom,
Marques Sullivan,
Mickey Sutton,
Marvin Switzer,
Gene Sykes

T
Mike Taliaferro,
Darryl Talley,
Carl Taseff,
Steve Tasker,
Bob Tatarek,
Brian Taylor,
Tyrod Taylor,
Trey Teague,
Jimmy Teal,
Richard Tharpe,
Anthony Thomas,
Damon Thomas,
Ike Thomas,
Kevin Thomas,
Kiwaukee Thomas,
Stacey Thomas,
Thurman Thomas,
Gary Thompson,
Bubba Thornton,
Tim Tindale,
Marco Tongue,
Pat Toomay,
Laverne Torczon,
Willie Totten,
John Tracey,
Rod Trafford,
Richard Trapp,
Mark Traynowicz,
Larry Tripplett,
Erroll Tucker,
Ross Tucker,
Maugaula Tuitele,
Nate Turner,
Vernon Turner,
Rick Tuten,
Perry Tuttle,
Maurice Tyler

U
Morris Unutoa, 
Kraig Urbik

V
Vern Valdez,
Alex Van Pelt,
Pete Van Valkenburg,
Phil Villapiano,
Chris Villarrial,
Troy Vincent,
Scott Virkus,
Tim Vogler

W
Jim Wagstaff,
Mark Walczak,
Darwin Walker,
Donnie Walker,
Langston Walker,
Craig Walls,
Chris Walsh,
Len Walterscheid,
Larry Walton,
Ernie Warlick,
Charley Warner,
Dave Washington,
Mickey Washington,
Ted Washington,
Vic Washington,
Larry Watkins,
Sammy Watkins,
Chris Watson,
Scott Watters,
Jason Webster,
Ted Wegert,
John Wendling,
Al Wenglikowski,
Willie West,
Manch Wheeler,
Craig White,
David White,
Jan White,
Sherman White,
Donte Whitner,
Arthur Whittington,
Jason Whittle,
Marcellus Wiley,
Gary Wilkins,
Ben Williams,
Chris Williams,
Clarence Williams,
James Williams,
Kevin Williams (CB),
Kevin Williams (WR),
Kyle Williams,
Leonard Williams,
Mike Williams,
Pat Williams,
Shaud Williams,
Van Williams,
Keith Willis,
Leonard Willis,
Don Wilson,
Eric Wilson,
George Wilson,
Karl Wilson,
Mike Wilson,
Jeff Winans,
Antoine Winfield,
Stan Winfrey,
Coy Wire,
Billy Witt,
Wayne Wolff,
Will Wolford,
Robert Woods, 
Roscoe Word,
Dwayne Wright,
Jeff Wright,
Kenyatta Wright,
Alvin Wyatt,
Sam Wyche

Y
John Yaccino,
T.J. Yates,
Jeff Yeates,
Mack Yoho,
Ashton Youboty,
Dave Young,
Duane Young,
Vince Young,
Willie Young,
Sid Youngelman

Z
Rich Zecher,
Dusty Zeigler,
Connie Zelencik

References
 

 
Buffalo Bil
Players